Norman's Crossing is an unincorporated farming community in Williamson County, Texas, United States.  The community is located on Brushy Creek between Hutto and Rice's Crossing, near the intersection of FM 3349 and FM 1660, and about 25 miles northeast of Austin.

References

Unincorporated communities in Williamson County, Texas
Greater Austin
Unincorporated communities in Texas